Mille Lacs Indian Reservation is the popular name for the land-base for the Mille Lacs Band of Ojibwe in Central Minnesota, about 100 miles (160 km) north of Minneapolis-St. Paul.  The contemporary Mille Lacs Band reservation has significant land holdings in Mille Lacs, Pine, Aitkin and Crow Wing counties, as well as other land holdings in Kanabec, Morrison, and Otter Tail Counties.  Mille Lacs Indian Reservation is also the name of a formal Indian reservation established in 1855.  It is one of the two formal reservations on which the contemporary Mille Lacs Band retains land holdings.  The contemporary Mille Lacs band includes several aboriginal Ojibwe bands and villages, whose members reside in communities throughout central Minnesota.

Reservations

Mille Lacs Lake Indian Reservation

Before the raising of the lake level, United States v. Mille Lac Band of Chippewa Indians (229 U.S. 498 (1913)) cites the reservation as being  of land. It was initially established in 1855 under the Treaty of Washington for the Mille Lacs Indians and other Mississippi Chippewa (Ojibwe) Bands of Indians, but was later ceded back to the U.S. Government under later treaties. Under later treaties and statutes the reservation was reserved for the exclusive occupancy of the Mille Lacs Band, and was later opened to non-Indian timber harvesting and settlement. The US Census Bureau designates this reservation as part of "2270: Mille Lacs Indian Reservation and  Off-Reservation Trust Land".

This reservation contains the communities of Neyaashiing (Vineland) and Chi-minising (Isle). Neyaashiing houses the Mille Lacs Band of Ojibwe Government Center, Nay-Ah-Shing Lower and Upper Schools and the Ne-Ia-Shing Clinic.  It hosts Minnesota Historical Society's Mille Lacs Indian Museum.  Grand Casino Mille Lacs is also located in Neyaashiing. The central offices for Woodland National Bank, which is owned by the Mille Lacs Band, and the offices of the Band's Circle of Health supplementary Health Insurance, are both located in Onamia, Minnesota, within the Mille Lacs Indian Reservation.  Chi-minising houses the Chiminising Community Center and District IIa Government Services Center.

The reservation is located in Kathio Township, South Harbor Township, and Isle Harbor Township in Mille Lacs County. Other lands held in trust by the United States on behalf of the Mille Lacs Band of Ojibwe is also found, contiguous to the Mille Lacs Indian Reservation, in southwest corner of Idun Township in Aitkin County.

In March 2022, the United States District Court for the District of Minnesota reaffirmed that the territory set aside in the Treaty of 1855 still has federal reservation status, ruling in favor of the Mille Lacs Band of Ojibwe in a boundary dispute with Mille Lacs County.

Sandy Lake Indian Reservation
Like Misi-zaaga'iganiing, it too was initially established in 1855 under the Treaty of Washington for the Mississippi Bands of Chippewa Indians. Under a later treaty it was reserved for the exclusive occupancy of the Sandy Lake Band, and it was later opened to non-Indian settlement. The US Census Bureau designates this reservation as "2385: Sandy Lake Indian Reservation".

Today, nearly all of the land within this reservation is non-Native American owned.  The Gaa-mitaawangaagamaag community of the historical Sandy Lake Band of Mississippi Chippewa is located adjacent to and within the northern portion of the reservation.  The Manoominikaan-zaaga'iganiing community of the historical Rice Lake band of Mississippi Chippewa is located adjacent to the reservation on the southern portion of the reservation. The United States Army Corps of Engineers operate a small flood-control dam within this Indian Reservation.

The reservation is located in parts of Libby, Shamrock, Turner, and Workman Townships in Aitkin County.

Other reservation holdings
Aggregated  as part of the US Census Bureau designated "2270: Mille Lacs Indian Reservation and  Off-Reservation Trust Land", Mille Lacs Indian Reservation have scatted trust parcels less than  each in Pine, Kanabec, southern Aitkin, Crow Wing and Morrison Counties, Minnesota. In addition, Mille Lacs Indian Reservation maintains the land upkeep on the Minnesota Chippewa Tribe ricing parcel at Star Lake. Furthermore, each Minnesota Chippewa Tribe member reservation, including the Mille Lacs Indian Reservation, hold equal one-sixth (1/6) interest on all Minnesota Chippewa Tribe member reservations, though asserting jurisdiction only on their own reservation.

Districts
Due to the large territorial spread of the contemporary Mille Lacs Band of Ojibwe, the Mille Lacs Band's statutes divide its territory into three administrative districts and one special services district.

District I
The Neyaashiing District (District I) serves the Band members living in the western two-thirds of the Misi-zaaga'iganiing and  service area from that portion of the reservation. In addition, any requested services outside of the pre-defined service districts are coordinated though this district.

District II
Gaa-mitaawangaagamaag District (District II) serves the Band members living in the eastern one-third of the Misi-zaaga'iganiing Reservation, all of Gaa-mitaawangaagamaag Reservation, the Manoominikaan-zaaga'iganiing Community and the Minisinaakwaang Community and  service area from those locations.

This district is further sub-divided into two sub-districts: Districts IIa and IIb. District IIa is associated with the Chi-minising Community (Isle, Minnesota). District IIb comprises the rest of District II. Minisinaakwaang Community houses the Mille Lacs Indian Reservation District II Community and Government Services Center, serving primarily District IIb.

District III

Aazhoomog District (District III) of the Mille Lacs Indian Reservation is located primarily in Pine County, comprises the Ne-zhingwaakokaag (Pine City-Rock Creek-Pokegama Lake) community of the historical Snake and Knife Rivers Band of the St. Croix Chippewa Indians of Minnesota, Gaa-zhiigwanaabikokaag (Hinckley) and Asiniikaaning (Sandstone) communities of the historical Kettle River Band of St. Croix Chippewa Indians of Minnesota, and the Aazhoomog (Lake Lena) Village of the historical St. Croix Chippewa Indians of Minnesota, and  service area from those locations.  Though historically forming the western half of the St. Croix Chippewa Indians, these communities associated with the Mille Lacs band since the 1800s and are a part of today's contemporary Mille Lacs Band of Ojibwe. The contemporary St. Croix Chippewa Indians of Wisconsin, located east of the St. Croix River, is considered a federally recognized tribe, which is not associated with the Mille Lacs Band of Ojibwe, located west of the St. Croix River.

Aazhoomog Village houses the Mille Lacs Indian Reservation District III Community and Government Service Center and the Aazhoomog Clinic of the Ne-Ia-Shing Health Clinic system.  Operating out of Gaa-zhiigwanaabikokaag is Grand Casino Hinckley and their various enterprises, including a golf course, RV park and a concert hall.

Urban Area
The Urban Area of the Mille Lacs Indian Reservation is a special services district serving the large number of Mille Lacs Band of Ojibwe living in the Twin Cities urban area. Originally in the Band's statutes, the urban area was established and defined as being Anoka, Hennepin and Ramsey Counties, providing TANF services to Band members in those three counties. While TANF services are still at the core for services provided to Band members living in the urban area, the Urban District has grown in providing other tribal supportive services, before available only on the Mille Lacs Indian Reservation proper. With a cooperative agreement with the city of Minneapolis, Minnesota, the Urban Area provides affordable rental housing units to eligible low-income Band members.

Demographics
As of the census of 2020, the combined population of Mille Lacs Reservation and Off-Reservation Trust Land was 4,767.

The reservation has a significant non-native population due in part to the allotment and sale of Ojibwe lands in the late nineteenth and early twentieth century. In 2020, the racial makeup of the reservation and off-reservation trust land was 60.6% White, 31.8% Native American, 0.3% Asian, 0.3% Black or African American, 0.9% from other races, and 6.2% from two or more races. Ethnically, the population was 2.7% Hispanic or Latino of any race.

Communities
Though only nine communities are cited in the Band's statutes, the Mille Lacs Band of Ojibwe has ten formal communities and additional six informal communities.

Ten formal communities:
Vineland, Minnesota (Nay-ah-shing [Neyaashiing])
Isle, Minnesota (Chi-mini-sing [Chi-minising])
East Lake, Minnesota (Mi-ni-si-na-kwang [Minisinaakwaang])
Minnewawa, Minnesota (Manoominikaan-zaaga'iganiing)
Sandy Lake, Minnesota (Ga-me-ta-wa-ga-gi-mog [Gaa-mitaawangaagamaag])
Sandstone, Minnesota (A-sin-ni-ga-ning [Asiniikaaning])
Lake Lena, Minnesota (Ah-sho-moog [Aazhoomog])
Hinckley, Minnesota (Ga-shi-gwa-na-bi-go-gog [Gaa-zhiigwanaabikokaag])
Pine City, Minnesota (Ne-shi-gwa-go-gog [Ne-zhingwaakokaag])
The Twin Cities (Gichi-oodenaang)
Six informal communities:
 Brainerd, Minnesota (Oshki-oodenaang)
 Onamia, Minnesota (Gibaakwa'igaansing)
 Cove, Minnesota (Wiikwegamaang)
 Wahkon, Minnesota (Zaagawaamikaag-wiidwedong)
 Moose Lake, Minnesota (Mooz-eskani-zaaga'iganiing)
 Duluth, Minnesota (Onigamiinsing)

Education
The tribal school is Nay Ah Shing School, with the Abinoojiiyag School (Nay Ah Shing Lower School) and Nay Ah Shing Upper School at the Vineland Campus, and Pine Grove Academy at the Lake Lena Campus.

In East Lake, the tribe operates Minisinaakwaang Leadership Academy, a Minnesota charter school.

Significant number of tribe's children also attend public schools in communities in and around the Inddian Reservation.

See also
Minnesota Indian Affairs Council
 Aaniin Ekidong: Ojibwe Vocabulary Project. St. Paul: Minnesota Humanities Center, 2009.
 Treuer, Anton. Ojibwe in Minnesota. St. Paul: Minnesota Historical Society Press, 2010.
 Treuer, Anton. Living Our Language: Ojibwe Tales & Oral Histories. St. Paul: Minnesota Historical Society Press, 2001.

References

External links
 The Mille Lacs Band of Ojibwe

Mille Lacs Band of Ojibwe
American Indian reservations in Minnesota
Anishinaabe reservations and tribal-areas in the United States
Ojibwe reserves and reservations
Populated places in Aitkin County, Minnesota
Populated places in Mille Lacs County, Minnesota
Populated places in Pine County, Minnesota
Populated places in Kanabec County, Minnesota
Populated places in Crow Wing County, Minnesota
Populated places in Morrison County, Minnesota
Populated places in Otter Tail County, Minnesota